The discography of YG, an American rapper, consists of six studio albums, 55 singles (including 25 as a featured artist) and nine mixtapes. YG's debut studio album, My Krazy Life, was released on March 18, 2014. His second studio album, Still Brazy, was released on June 17, 2016. His best known singles include "Big Bank", "My Nigga" and "Who Do You Love".

Albums

Studio albums

Collaborative albums

Soundtrack albums

Mixtapes

Singles

As lead artist

As featured artist

Other charted songs

Promotional singles

Guest appearances

Music videos

Notes

References

External links
 Official website
 
 
 

Discographies of American artists
Hip hop discographies